Ketil Lenning (born 1950) is a Norwegian business person.

Biography
Ketil Lenning graduated from the Texas A&M University with a Bachelor of Science in 1974. He became the chief operating officer of Odfjell Drilling in 2001 and chief executive officer in 2005. He is also chairman of the board of Odfjell Invest. Lenning has over 15 years of experience from oil companies and in addition has 13 years' experience within maritime drilling and oil production with companies such as Smedvig.

References

1950 births
Living people
Norwegian businesspeople
People in the petroleum industry
Texas A&M University alumni
People from Stavanger
Chief operating officers
Norwegian expatriates in the United States